Kyle Naughton (born 17 November 1988) is an English professional footballer who plays as a right back for  club Swansea City.

Naughton was a product of Sheffield United's academy before breaking into their first team in 2008, transferring to Tottenham Hotspur the following year. He has represented England at under-21 level as well as having loan spells with Gretna, Middlesbrough, Leicester City and Norwich City.

Club career

Sheffield United
Naughton was born in Sheffield, South Yorkshire. He was a product of Sheffield United's centre of excellence and academy, having trained with the club the age of seven. He attended an England under-15 training camp during the 2004–05 season, and over the years has become a regular in the Academy and reserve teams. He captained his club's academy team to the quarter-finals of the FA Youth Cup in the 2006–07 season.

He was signed by Scottish Premier League team Gretna on loan in January 2008, and made his league debut for Gretna against Rangers on 16 January 2008. He played regularly for the rest of the season at the troubled Scottish club who were placed into administration during his tenure there. Despite this Naughton continued for Gretna as the Blades agreed to cover insurance payments needed to allow him to play. Naughton played 19 times for the club but was unable to help them avoid relegation.
Naughton made his first team debut for the Blades the following season, coming on as a second-half substitute in the first round of the League Cup against Port Vale in August 2008. In his second substitute appearance for the club he netted the winning goal in a 2–1 League Cup success over Yorkshire rivals Huddersfield Town.

Naughton made his league debut on 20 September 2008 against Norwich City, he then went on to make his first start for Sheffield United in their 2–1 victory over Watford on 27 September 2008, gaining the man of the match award. From that point he cemented his place in the starting eleven and was virtually ever present for the rest of the season, becoming first choice at right back whilst also making a couple of appearances in midfield and finishing the season playing at left back to cover for the injured Gary Naysmith. His successful season was rewarded when he was voted Young Player of the Year by the United supporters club, was runner up to Matthew Kilgallon in the senior Player of the Year award and was included in the Championship PFA Team of the Year.

Tottenham Hotspur

Despite major interest from Everton, Naughton signed for Tottenham Hotspur in July 2009 along with fellow Sheffield United player Kyle Walker for a combined fee of £9 million. He made his Spurs non-competitive debut against Barcelona in the 2009 Wembley Cup which ended in a 1–1 draw. He came on as a substitute in the 94th minute in the match against West Ham United, which was the club's third match in the 2009–10 season to mark his debut in the Premier League. Naughton then signed a six-month loan deal with Middlesbrough on 1 February 2010. He made his debut in the 1–1 draw against Ipswich Town.

After returning to Tottenham he was loaned out again initially until January to another Championship club, Leicester City. He made his debut on 16 October in a 1–1 draw against Hull City. In his second match for Leicester City, against Leeds United, he scored the second league goal of his career. He scored again for Leicester City in the 5–1 win against Doncaster Rovers. He also scored against Barnsley in a 4–1 win on 5 February with a 30-yard drive into the top corner. Naughton also scored a 25-yard rocket to equalise for Leicester in the M69 derby against Coventry. On 12 March, Naughton scored Leicester's 3rd goal in their 3–0 win over Scunthorpe. Leicester extended Naughton's loan until the end of the 2010–11 season on 8 January after a permanent move failed to materialise. In April, Naughton was named as right back in the Championship PFA Team of the Year for the second time in three years and won the Leicester City Young Player of the Year award.

On 21 July 2011, Naughton signed a season-long loan deal to Premier League team Norwich City from Tottenham Hotspur. He was handed squad number 25 for his year in Norfolk. Naughton was an unused substitute for the Canaries opening Premier League fixture against Wigan Athletic on 13 August 2011. Naughton displaced Russell Martin as the first-choice right back, and started the matches against Stoke, Chelsea and West Brom. In all, he made twenty-three appearances over the course of the season at either right back or centre back.

Naughton made his first full league start for Tottenham on 16 September 2012 away to Reading, a match in which Tottenham won 3–1.

Swansea City

Naughton joined Swansea City on 22 January 2015 for a reported £5 million. Naughton quickly established himself as first choice right back for Swansea, before being ruled out for the remainder of the 2014–15 Premier League season with ankle ligament damage in a 3–1 victory over Hull City.

International career
In November 2008, after only eleven league appearances, Naughton was called up to the England under-21 team for the friendly against the Czech Republic under-21 team at Bramall Lane. He duly made his England debut, coming on as a 60th-minute substitute in a 2–0 victory. Naughton is also eligible to play for the Republic of Ireland national team.

Career statistics

Honours
Individual
PFA Team of the Year: 2008–09 Championship, 2010–11 Championship
Leicester City Young Player of the Year: 2010–11
Sheffield United Young Player of the Year: 2008–09

References

External links

Profile at the Swansea City A.F.C. website

1988 births
Living people
Footballers from Sheffield
English footballers
England under-21 international footballers
Association football defenders
Sheffield United F.C. players
Gretna F.C. players
Tottenham Hotspur F.C. players
Middlesbrough F.C. players
Leicester City F.C. players
Norwich City F.C. players
Swansea City A.F.C. players
Premier League players
English Football League players
Scottish Premier League players
Black British sportsmen
English people of Irish descent